Foshan railway station is located in Chancheng District, Foshan, Guangdong Province, China. Train services include those departing to Guangzhou, Kunming, Nanning and Hainan in mainland China. In 10 June 2019, the service originally to Hong Kong is officially shortened to Guangzhou East railway station, leaving border crossing facilities in the station abandon.

Since 2022, the station is also served by Line 3 of the Foshan Metro.

See also
Foshan West railway station

References

Railway stations in Guangdong
Buildings and structures in Foshan
China–Hong Kong border crossings